Ignace Matondo Kwa Nzambi (April 12, 1932 – September 9, 2011) was the Roman Catholic bishop of the Roman Catholic Diocese of Molegbe, Democratic Republic of the Congo.

Ordained to the priesthood in 1964, Matondo Kwa Nzambi was appointed bishop of the Basankusu Diocese in 1974. In 1998, he was appointed bishop of the Molegbe Diocese, retiring in 2007.

Notes

21st-century Roman Catholic bishops in the Democratic Republic of the Congo
1932 births
2011 deaths
20th-century Roman Catholic bishops in the Democratic Republic of the Congo
Roman Catholic bishops of Basankusu
Roman Catholic bishops of Molegbe
21st-century Democratic Republic of the Congo people